Ioel (mid 6th century) was a King of the Kingdom of Aksum. He is primarily known through the coins that were minted during his reign. He was succeeded atop the throne by Hataz.

References

Kings of Axum
6th-century monarchs in Africa
Year of death unknown
Year of birth unknown